Larry M. James (born 1950) is an American social worker and the current President and CEO of CitySquare located in Dallas, Texas.

Life
James was born in Spokane, Washington and grew up in Richardson, Texas, where his father served as the city secretary. He served in a New Orleans Church of Christ ministry while attending New Orleans Baptist Theological Seminary before returning to the Dallas area. He served as the senior minister for the Richardson East Church of Christ in Richardson, Texas for 14 years. James took leadership of CitySquare in 1994, while it was still known as Central Dallas Ministries.

Education
B.A. Harding University (1972)
M.A. Harding School of Theology (1973)
M.Div. New Orleans Baptist Theological Seminary (1977)
M.A. Tulane University (1986)

Publications
The Wealth of the Poor, Abilene, Texas: Abilene Christian University Press, 2013. .

Personal life
Larry is married to Brenda. They have lived in inner city Dallas, Texas since 1999.

References

Writers from Spokane, Washington
1950 births
Living people
American social workers
Harding University alumni